Karpovskaya
Karpovskaya, Vytegorsky District, Vologda Oblast
Karpovskaya, Tarnogsky District, Vologda Oblast
Karpovskaya, Yavengskoye Rural Settlement, Vozhegodsky District, Vologda Oblast

Feminine form of the Russian surname Karpovsky

See also

Karpovsky (disambiguation)